Dil Diya Dard Liya is a 1966 Hindi romance film based upon Emily Brontë's 1847 novel Wuthering Heights. The film is directed by Abdur Rashid Kardar and Dilip Kumar. The film stars Dilip Kumar, Waheeda Rehman, Rehman, Pran, and Johnny Walker. The music is by Naushad. The songs include "Koi Sagar Dil Ko Behlata Nahin", "Phir Teri Kahani Yaad Aayi", "Guzre Hain Aaj Ishq Mein", "Dilruba Maine Tere Pyar Mein". It inspired the 1983 Pakistani film Dehleez starring Nadeem, Shabnam, Afzal Ahmed and Agha Taalish and the 1985 Hindi movie Oonche Log. The film was Dilip Kumar's first outright flop in 15 years at the box-office.

Plot
The film begins with a sea storm that sinks a ship leaving a child as the sole survivor. In another scene a king is shown waiting for his grandchild. He dies still waiting but bequeaths his property to his grandchild, Shankar. Thakur, a kindhearted, widowed landlord, lives a wealthy lifestyle with his son Ramesh, daughter Roopa and an adopted child, Shankar. Ramesh hates Shankar and openly mistreats him.

Years pass by and Thakur dies. A grown-up Ramesh (Pran) frequents a beautiful courtesan, drinks alcohol, and continues to abuse and mercilessly beat Shankar (Dilip Kumar), who bears this in silence. Meanwhile, over the years, Shankar and Roopa (Waheeda Rehman) have fallen in love with each other. When Ramesh finds out, he has Shankar severely beaten and thrown off a cliff. Ramesh then arranges Roopa's marriage to a wealthy man, Satish (Rehman), while he continues to romance the courtesan Tara Bai (Rani) and signs over his entire estate and home to her.

A few years later, Shankar returns as the wealthy king of Belapur. He is fully prepared to compromise with Ramesh and propose to Roopa. He finds out that nothing has changed, however. Ramesh, though rendered penniless by Tara, still hates Shankar. Satish is engaged to Roopa and a marriage date has been fixed. Shankar's love is now replaced by vengeance and hate, and all he can think of is destroying the lives of Ramesh, Roopa, Satish and his sister, Mala (Shyama), and he devises several plans to destroy their lives.

Cast
 Dilip Kumar as Shankar / Raja Sahab (Heathcliff)
 Waheeda Rehman as Roopa (Catherine Earnshaw)
 Pran as Thakur Ramesh (Hindley Earnshaw)
 Rehman as Satish (Edgar Linton)
 Johnny Walker as Murlidhar
 Shyama as Mala (Isabella Linton)
 Rani as Tarabai
 Dulari as Basanti
 D. K. Sapru as Ramesh's Father
 Murad as Maharaja of Belapur
 Tun Tun as. Mrs. Murlidhar

Music

The soundtrack for the movie was composed by Naushad and lyrics penned by Shakeel Badayuni. The soundtrack consists of 8 songs, featuring vocals by Mohammed Rafi, Asha Bhosle and Lata Mangeshkar.

Track listing

Awards and nominations
14th Filmfare Awards (1967)
Nominated
 Best Actor - Dilip Kumar
 Best Supporting Actor - Pran

References

External links
 

1966 films
1960s Hindi-language films
Films directed by A. R. Kardar
Films based on Wuthering Heights